House of Horror or House of Horrors may refer to:

In film and television
 House of Horror, a 1929 horror comedy film
 House of Horrors, a 1946 Universal Pictures horror film
 Hammer House of Horror, a television series produced by Hammer Film Productions
 New Line Cinema's House of Horror, a licensing division of New Line Cinema

Other uses
 Universal's House of Horrors, an attraction at the Universal Studios Hollywood theme park
 25 Cromwell Street, sometimes referred to as the "house of horrors", a house associated with serial killers Fred West and Rosemary West
 "House Of Horrors", a song by horrorcore group Insane Clown Posse
 Turpin case, referred to as the "house of horrors"
 "House of Horrors match", a professional wrestling match between Bray Wyatt and Randy Orton that took place at WWE Payback (2017)
 Haunted attraction (simulated)

See also
 Dr. Terror's House of Horrors, a 1965 British horror film
 The Haunted House of Horror, an early "slasher" film first released in 1969
 The Sweet House of Horrors, a 1989 Italian horror film
 Hugo's House of Horrors, a 1990 computer adventure game